Brown Bears ice hockey may refer to either of the ice hockey teams that represent Brown University:
Brown Bears men's ice hockey
Brown Bears women's ice hockey